Williamsburg is an unincorporated community in the U.S. state of Michigan. Located within Whitewater Township, Williamsburg is part of Grand Traverse County, and is part of the Traverse City micropolitan area.

History 
There is evidence that three different cultures of people have lived in this area since 10,500 BC, especially on Skegemog Point in Lake Skegemog and Elk Lake. Records show that a branch of the Algonquin people, known as the Mascoutin, lived in the area until around 1630s. The Ottawa and Chippewa peoples came in after this, until the early 1800s.

In 1856, three families from Monroe County, New York, settled the area, and called it Mill Creek. In 1867, the community was given a post office, named Dunbar, after its first postmaster. The post office was renamed to Williamsburgh in 1869, and the "h" was later dropped in 1894.

In 1892, an extension of the Chicago and West Michigan Railroad opened through Williamsburg. In 1982, the rail line, which had previously extended to Charlevoix and Petoskey, was terminated at Williamsburg.

In 1973, 100 to 150 sinkholes opened up around the town due to natural gas leaks. The sinkholes were caused by increased oil and natural gas drilling operations caused by the 1973 oil crisis. The leaks started when Amoco well E1-22 struck a pocket of natural gas under the village. The gas was then over pressurized, and tore open holes in the surface soil. Residents were evacuated and an exclusion zone was established. Few pictures of the event remain, as fears that the spark of a camera could light the gas in the air, causing the whole town to spontaneously combust. The newly constructed thoroughfare into Traverse City, M-72, was rendered completely unusable after the event. A class action lawsuit was filed by residents that had been displaced for several months during the event. Silt that had become disturbed along creeks and streams in the area had poured in to the Grand Traverse Bay and raised environmental concerns and concerns over the safety of the usually clear water.

Transportation

Major highway 
  runs east-west directly through the down, providing access to Traverse City and Kalkaska. Old M-72 also serves as a Main Street in the northern section of the town.

Notable resident 

 Adam Trautman, National Football League (NFL) tight end, grew up in Williamsburg.

References 

Unincorporated communities in Michigan
Unincorporated communities in Grand Traverse County, Michigan
Former villages in Michigan